Braden is a small unincorporated community in northern Union County, Tennessee.

Braden is a rural community cut off from the rest of Union County by water from Norris Lake; it can only be reached by ferry or by a long drive from Claiborne County.

The community was named for the local Braden family of settlers.

References

Unincorporated communities in Union County, Tennessee
Unincorporated communities in Tennessee